Puniceibacterium confluentis is a  Gram-negative, aerobic and non-motile bacterium from the genus of Puniceibacterium which has been isolated from water near the Jeju island in Korea.

References

External links
Type strain of Puniceibacterium confluentis at BacDive -  the Bacterial Diversity Metadatabase

Rhodobacteraceae
Bacteria described in 2017